520 Fifth Avenue is a mixed-use supertall building under construction in New York City. The building occupies the former site of three structures. Rabina is developing the building, and architectural firm Kohn Pedersen Fox designed the structure and serves as architect of record.

Site history

Attempted redevelopment efforts
The site of the skyscraper was formerly occupied by three buildings: 516 and 518 Fifth Avenue, and an office building at the 520 Fifth Avenue address. Before the Great Recession, Aby Rosen owned 516 and 518 Fifth Avenue. Through his firm, RFR, Rosen at one time intended to partner with Hines to develop 516 Fifth Avenue into a mixed-use skyscraper designed by Pelli Clarke Pelli, though these plans were never realized.

Later, RFR entered into a joint venture with Tahl-Propp Equities, owner of 520 Fifth Avenue, planning to either redevelop the site occupied by the three structures, or to sell the three buildings to another developer or investor. RFR and Tahl-Propp entered into the deal to redevelop or sell the composite site in 2007. After a legal dispute between RFR and Tahl-Propp, RFR purchased 516 and 518 Fifth Avenue, paying approximately $10 million for each building. RFR did not redevelop the site, and Thor Equities began the process of purchasing the buildings from Rosen's firm in 2011, ultimately closing the transaction in 2012. An image of a six-story retail component for the site was released in February 2014. In December 2014, Thor filed to build a 71-story, 920-foot skyscraper on a three-story retail podium. Handel Architects was the architect of record for this design.

Thor did not proceed with the building, and ultimately sold the site to a joint venture between Ceruzzi Properties and SMI USA for $325 million in 2015. The firms received financing in the form of loans from JPMorgan Chase and Fisher Brothers. New York YIMBY reported that the two firms would proceed with plans for a building designed by Handel Architects, originally produced for Thor. In an interview in 2015, Louis Ceruzzi, founder of Ceruzzi Properties, stated the firm intended to begin construction on the site in early 2016. In 2017, Ceruzzi and SMI received a bridge loan from Mack Real Estate Credit Strategies, which took the place of the earlier financing. The Real Deal reported that the two firms were looking for a third development partner in 2018. New York City developers including Extell and Zeckendorf were among the potential partners considered. In 2018, Ceruzzi and SMI defaulted on the Mack loan. Mack placed the loan for sale through HFF.

Rabina development
Developer Rabina purchased the site in 2019. Rabina repaid Mack during the process of buying the site, and secured a new mortgage for $110 million from Bank OZK. Plans for a building designed by Kohn Pedersen Fox were filed in early 2021, replacing the earlier Thor (and subsequently Ceruzzi and SMI) plan designed by Handel Architects. New York YIMBY reported that Kohn Pedersen Fox had redesigned the plans for the skyscraper in December 2021. Rabina received a combined $540 million in construction financing from Bank OZK and The Carlyle Group in March 2022. Excavation began at the site between December 2021 and March 2022, and was still underway in July 2022.

Usage
The building will be mixed-use, with residences and office space, and restaurants on the first three stories. Bank OZK made the construction loan to the project's developer despite a drop in foot traffic on Fifth Avenue (attributed to the COVID-19 pandemic) due to project's residential component and the enduring strength of the Manhattan residential market.

See also
List of tallest buildings in New York City

References

 

Buildings and structures under construction in the United States
Fifth Avenue
Kohn Pedersen Fox buildings
Midtown Manhattan
Office buildings in Manhattan
Residential buildings in Manhattan